The Order of the Polar Star (Mongolian:  , Traditional Mongolian: ᠠᠯᠲᠠᠨ ᠭᠠᠳᠠᠰᠤ ᠣᠳᠤᠨ) is a state award of Mongolia. It is the highest civilian award Mongolia can present to a foreign citizen. The order was created in 1936. The regulation was approved by the resolution of the Presidium of the Small Khural and the Council of Ministers of the MPR on May 16, 1941.

Description 
It comes in four types: Type 1 (1936), Type 2 (1940), Type 3 (1940-41), Type 4 (1970). For everyday wear, the order had a symbol in the form of an order bar. Until 1961, the bar of the order was rectangular metal, covered with colored enamel. Since 1961, the enamel strips have been replaced by strips covered with ribbons in the order's colors.

Previous recipients

From Mongolia 

 Khorloogiin Choibalsan
 Luvsannorovyn Erdenechimeg
Damba Ayusheev
Sonomyn Luvsangombo
Jamsrangijn Jondon
 Zaluuchuudyn Unen Newspaper
 Tsog Magazine
 National Museum of Mongolia
Central Military Hospital

From America 
 Barack Obama
 Hillary Clinton
 Peace Corps Mongolia
 John McCain
 Pamela J. H. Slutz
 Ted Yoho
Jack Weatherford
Dr Amanda Baric Australia
 Maria Fernández-Giménez
 Richard P. Reading

From Russia 

 Kliment Voroshilov
Yury Luzhkov
Okna Tsahan Zamn
Gavriil Ilizarov
Alexander Novikov
Vladimir Shatalov
Iskander Azizov
 St Petersburg University

Other 
 Małgorzata Gosiewska (Poland)
Krzysztof Stanowski (Poland)
 R. K. Sabharwal (India)
Princess Maha Chakri Sirindhorn (Thailand)
 Gil Gang Muk (South Korea)

References 

1936 establishments in Mongolia
Orders, decorations, and medals of Mongolia
Awards established in 1936